Ort Itzhak Rabin Gan Yavne (formerly referred to as Ort Gan Yavne, and as Kiryat Hinuch Rabin) is a pluralistic secular Jewish high school and junior high school in Gan Yavne, Israel.
It was founded in 1995 as the first high school in the town of Gan Yavne, after years students from the town studied in the relatively close town of Gedera. It was named after the late Prime Minister of Israel, Yitzhak Rabin.

The students are mostly from Gan Yavne, but some come from the nearby moshav Bitzaron. The school has high rates of Bagrut graduates and fairly high Israel Defense Forces recruitments stat.

It has the following division into classes: Computer Programming (including Cyber security), Biology (with the opportunity of expanding it with one of the following: Jewish thought, Arts, Geography, Theater & Journalism), Biotechnology and Humanities (Psychology). Besides Hebrew language classes, the school also offers Arabic which is studied as a foreign language alongside the mandatory English language (the school is one of the few that teaches 7 units level Bagrut in English).

The school's football field was more than doubled in size in construction works that started in November 2005 and were finished in October 2006. The nearby open field north of the basketball & volleyball arena was turned into a 2nd parking lot and was added to the school's property during 2009. The school's Junior High building's classes are used as a voting booths during national and local elections.

As of 2010, the school has a robotics team who achieved worldwide prizes in FIRST Robotics Competition. The school's auditorium has also been used in Shabbat as the local small community of Reform Jews' Synagogue. The school's basketball arena was also used by the local basketball team Hapoel Gan Yavne that played in the Liga Bet minor league's southern division.

Since 2008, there is a second ORT Israel junior high school (and high school) in Gan Yavne; Although, the second one is named "Ort Naomi Shemer", after the late Israeli poet Naomi Shemer.

In 2013 a local Police Department was built in the area next to the Junior High.

During the COVID-19 pandemic, the northern parking lot (rebuilt in late 2019) was declared a Coronavirus testing area on October 27, 2020.

Notable alumni
 Itay Turgeman (class of 2001) - Israeli actor and television host and an Ophir Award winner in 2002
 Iman Al-Abud (class of 2003) -  Israeli-Bedouin reality contestant girl at Project Y second season in 2004
 Matan Ohayon (class of 2005) - Israeli Premier League footballer
 Inna Bakelman (class of 2007) - Israeli actress, model and reality contestant girl at Survivor Israel third season in 2009 
 Lior Ohayon (class of 2008) - Israeli chef, fashion designer and reality contestant girl at MasterChef Israel eighth season in 2019 as well as at The Next Restaurant of Israel first season in 2022
 Dana Zalah (class of 2008) - Israeli singer and reality final stages girl at The Voice Israel second season in 2012
 Matan Jaboc (class of 2008) - Israel's Channel 12 News (formerly known as Channel 2 News) weather presenter
 Shoval Elgrabli (class of 2011) - Israeli model and a Miss Israel 2012 beauty pageant contestant
 Sahar Calizo (class of 2011) - Israeli YouTuber starring in HOT's docu-reality Project Calizo in 2018
 Bar Cohen (class of 2012) - Israeli singer and reality winner girl at Eyal Golan Kore Lach fourth season in 2016
 Roni Brachel (class of 2018) - Israeli model, singer and reality contestant girl at Rising Star (Israel) to the Eurovision fifth season; a Miss Israel 2020 beauty pageant contestant

See also
 World ORT
 ORT Israel
 Gan Yavne

References

External links
Ort Itzhak Rabin website
ORT Israel website
ORT Itzhak Rabin's Facebook page

High schools in Israel
Educational institutions established in 1995
1995 establishments in Israel
Buildings and structures in Central District (Israel)